The 1973 SANFL Grand Final was an Australian rules football game contested between the Glenelg Football Club and North Adelaide Football Club at Adelaide Oval on 29 September 1973. It was the 75th annual grand final of the South Australian National Football League (SANFL), staged to determine the premiers for the 1973 SANFL season. The match, attended by 56,525 spectators, was won by Glenelg by a margin of seven points, marking the club's second SANFL flag, breaking a 39-year premiership drought. It would be the last SANFL Grand Final held at Adelaide Oval until 2014.

Glenelg has been the top team all year, losing only one game all season (to North Adelaide in Round 7). In a tight grand final, Graham Cornes famously took a mark and kicked a goal to give Glenelg 1 point lead in the dying minutes, and then Glenelg kicked one more goal after the final siren.

Teams

Scorecard

References 

SANFL Grand Finals
SANFL Grand Final, 1973